Showboat is an album by American jazz trumpeter Kenny Dorham featuring performances of tunes from the Jerome Kern-Oscar Hammerstein II musical Show Boat recorded in 1960 and released on the Time label.

Reception

The Allmusic review by Scott Yanow awarded the album 4 stars and stated "This is one of Dorham's better sessions from the era and is easily recommended to his fans and collectors of hard bop".

Track listing
All compositions by Jerome Kern except as indicated
 "Why Do I Love You?" - 6:02
 "Nobody Else But Me" - 5:41
 "Can't Help Lovin' Dat Man" - 6:37
 "Make Believe" - 5:49
 "Ol' Man River" - 4:14
 "Bill" - 4:01

Personnel
Kenny Dorham - trumpet
Jimmy Heath - tenor saxophone 
Kenny Drew - piano
Jimmy Garrison - bass 
Art Taylor - drums

References 

Kenny Dorham albums
1961 albums
Albums produced by Bob Shad